Aimé Simon-Girard (20 March 1889 – 15 July 1950) was a French film actor. He was the son of the tenor Nicholas Simon-Max and the soprano Juliette Simon-Girard.

He played a leading role as d'Artagnan in the silent film Les Trois Mousquetaires (1921), the first film adaptation of the novel and his screen breakthrough role.

He starred in 20 films between 1921 and 1948.

Selected filmography
 Les Trois Mousquetaires (1921)
 Fanfan la Tulipe (1925)
 The Three Musketeers (1932)
 Arsene Lupin, Detective (1937)
 The Pearls of the Crown (1937)
 The Black Cavalier (1945)
 Mandrin (1947)

External links 

1889 births
1950 deaths
Male actors from Paris
French male film actors
French male silent film actors
20th-century French male actors
Burials at Batignolles Cemetery